Miyareth Mendoza Carabali is a Colombian weightlifter. She won the bronze medal in the women's 69 kg event at the 2017 World Weightlifting Championships held in Anaheim, United States. At the time, she finished in 4th place but this became the bronze medal after Romela Begaj of Albania tested positive for a banned substance.

She won the silver medal in the women's 71 kg event at the 2021 Pan American Weightlifting Championships held in Guayaquil, Ecuador.

References

External links 
 

Living people
Year of birth missing (living people)
Place of birth missing (living people)
Colombian female weightlifters
Pan American Weightlifting Championships medalists
World Weightlifting Championships medalists
South American Games silver medalists for Colombia
South American Games medalists in weightlifting
Competitors at the 2018 South American Games
21st-century Colombian women